Bilingual Today, French Tomorrow: Trudeau's Master Plan and How it Can be Stopped was a controversial 1977 book by Jock V. Andrew, a retired Canadian naval officer. It alleged that the prime minister Pierre Trudeau's policy of official bilingualism was a plot to make Canada a unilingually francophone country, by instituting reverse discrimination against Anglophone Canadians.

The book inspired the formation of the lobby group Alliance for the Preservation of English in Canada.

See also
Le Livre noir du Canada anglais

Notes

1977 non-fiction books
Bilingualism in Canada
Books about politics of Canada
Canadian political books
Books about conspiracy theories